Burksville is an unincorporated community in Shelby County, in the U.S. state of Missouri.

History
A post office called Burksville was established in 1892, and remained in operation until 1907. John T. Burk, a local merchant and early postmaster, gave the community his last name.

References

Unincorporated communities in Shelby County, Missouri
Unincorporated communities in Missouri